The Baeksang Arts Awards for Most Popular Actor is an award presented annually at the Baeksang Arts Awards ceremony organised by Ilgan Sports and JTBC Plus, affiliates of JoongAng Ilbo, usually in the second quarter of each year in Seoul. 

Before 2018, the winners were announced in both film and television categories. The award is voted by the public and all male acting nominees from film and television categories are eligible. TikTok has held the naming rights for this award since 2020.

List of winners

References

Sources

External links
  

1985 establishments in South Korea
Awards established in 1985
Baeksang Arts Awards (film)
Baeksang Arts Awards (television)
Film awards for lead actor
Television awards for Best Actor